St Ives was a rural district in Huntingdonshire from 1894 to 1974, surrounding the urban area of St Ives.
It was formed under the Local Government Act 1894 from the part of the St Ives rural sanitary district which was in Huntingdonshire (the rest, being in Cambridgeshire, formed the Swavesey Rural District).

It was expanded slightly in 1935 by taking in part of the disbanded Hartford parish.

In 1965 Huntingdonshire and the Soke of Peterborough merged to form Huntingdon and Peterborough, and the area of St Ives RD was reducuced very slightly.

In 1974 the district was abolished under the Local Government Act 1972 and became part of the non-metropolitan district of Huntingdon, subsequently renamed Huntingdonshire.

Parishes

References 

Districts of England abolished by the Local Government Act 1972
Districts of England created by the Local Government Act 1894
Rural districts of England